Philidris brunnea is a species of ant in the genus Philidris. Described by Donisthorpe in 1949, the species is endemic to New Guinea.

References

Dolichoderinae
Insects described in 1949
Hymenoptera of Asia
Insects of New Guinea
Endemic fauna of New Guinea